Princess Antoinette of Anhalt (3 March 1885 – 3 April 1963) was a Princess of Anhalt by birth. As the wife of Prince Frederick of Schaumburg-Lippe, she became a Princess of Schaumburg-Lippe by marriage. She was also the last remaining female-line descendant of George I, King of Great Britain.

Early life
Princess Antoinette was born on 3 March 1885 at Schloss Georgium near Dessau in Anhalt. Her parents were Leopold, Hereditary Prince of Anhalt and Princess Elisabeth of Hesse-Kassel (1861-1955).

Less than one year after the birth of his daughter, Leopold died unexpectedly in Cannes on 2 February 1886. Princess Elisabeth never remarried and survived her husband by almost 70 years. She died in Dessau on 7 June 1955.

Marriage and issue
Princess Antoinette married Prince Frederick of Schaumburg-Lippe as his second wife in Dessau on 26 May 1909. They had two sons:
 Prince Leopold Friedrich Alexander Wilhelm Eduard of Schaumburg-Lippe (21 February 1910 – 25 January 2006)
 Prince Wilhelm Friedrich Karl Adolf Leopold Hilderich of Schaumburg-Lippe (24 August 1912 – 4 March 1938)

Death
Princess Antoinette died in Dessau, then in the German Democratic Republic, on 3 April 1963. She was buried at the Ziebigk cemetery in Dessau next to her mother.

Ancestry

1885 births
1963 deaths
People from Dessau-Roßlau
House of Ascania
German people of French descent
19th-century German women
19th-century German people
20th-century German women
20th-century German people